Maharaja Bir Bikram University (MBB University) is a state university located at Agartala, Tripura, India. It is the first, and  the only state university in the state of Tripura.
The university is named after Bir Bikram Kishore Debbarman, the last ruling maharaja of the princely state of Tripura.

History
The University was established in 2015 by the Government of Tripura through the Maharaja Bir Bikram University Act, 2015 and the foundation stone was laid by the then Governor of Tripura, Tathagata Roy.

The first vice chancellor (VC) was Gautam Kumar Basu. Satyadeo Poddar was appointed VC in December 2019.

Location
The campus of MBB University is situated at Collegetilla, 3 km away from the city centre of Agartala.

Affiliated colleges 
MBB University has three affiliated colleges:
Bir Bikram Memorial College
Maharaja Bir Bikram College
Tripura Government Law College

See also
Education in India
Education in Tripura
List of institutions of higher education in Tripura

References

External links

Universities in Tripura
Education in Agartala
Educational institutions established in 2015
2015 establishments in Tripura
State universities in India